Tina Landau (born May 21, 1962) is an American playwright and theatre director.  Known for her large-scale, musical, and ensemble-driven work,  Landau's productions have appeared on Broadway, Off-Broadway, and regionally, most extensively at the Steppenwolf Theatre Company in Chicago where she is an ensemble member.

Early life 
Born in New York City to film and television producers Edie and Ely Landau, Landau moved with her family to Beverly Hills, California, where she graduated from Beverly Hills High School before attending Yale University, where she directed numerous productions as an undergraduate. She later attended the American Repertory Theater Institute for Advanced Theater Training at Harvard University. Her family is of Jewish background.

Career 
Landau's early work included site specific productions with New York City's En Garde Arts, including Orestes and The Trojan Women: A Love Story, both by Charles L. Mee, as well as her original play "Stonewall: Night Variations."   Floyd Collins, with a book by Landau and a score by Adam Guettel, opened off-Broadway at Playwrights Horizons in 1996. Landau was nominated for the Drama Desk Award for Outstanding Book of a Musical and the Drama Desk Award for Outstanding Director of a Musical, and the production won the Lucille Lortel Award for Best Musical.  A later version of the show played at San Diego's Old Globe Theater, The Goodman Theater in Chicago, and The Prince Music Theater in Philadelphia (where it was originally commissioned and produced.)

In 1997, she became a member of the Steppenwolf Theatre Company, where she has directed numerous productions including The Wheel, The Hot L Baltimore, Tarell Alvin McCraney's The Brother/Sister Plays and Head of Passes, The Tempest, The Time of Your Life (which later moved to Seattle Rep and A.C.T.), The Diary of Anne Frank, The Cherry Orchard, Theatrical Essays, Time to Burn, Berlin Circle, and The Ballad of Little Jo.

She made her Broadway debut directing the 2001 revival of Bells Are Ringing with Faith Prince, and in 2009 she returned to Broadway with the Steppenwolf production of Tracy Letts' Superior Donuts. In February 2015 Nickelodeon announced that she had been tapped to co-adapt and direct SpongeBob SquarePants, The Broadway Musical, a stage adaptation of SpongeBob SquarePants. The show opened on Broadway on December 4, 2017. For SpongeBob SquarePants, Landau was nominated for the 2018 Tony Award for Best Direction of a Musical at the 72nd Tony Awards. She won Best Director of a Musical at both the 2018 Drama Desk Awards and Outer Critics Circle Awards, and the production won for Best Musical in both awards as well.

Landau's other New York City directing credits include Old Hats (with Bill Irwin and David Shiner) at the Signature Theater, Paula Vogel's A Civil War Christmas at New York Theatre Workshop, Charles L. Mee’s Iphigenia 2.0 at the Signature, Dream True, Mary Rose, Miracle Brothers and Wig Out!, all at the Vineyard Theater,  as well as In the Red and Brown Water, Space, and Saturn Returns all at The Public Theater.

Landau's many other regional credits include Antony and Cleopatra at Hartford Stage, A Midsummer Night's Dream at the McCarter Theater and Papermill Playhouse, Of Thee I Sing at Papermill, The Cure at Troy at Seattle Rep, Zack Zadek's Deathless at Goodspeed Musicals, and the musical Dave at Arena Stage.

In addition to Floyd Collins, Landau's writing includes book and lyrics for Dream True and States of Independence, both with scores by Ricky Ian Gordon, the plays Beauty at La Jolla Playhouse (San Diego Critics Best Play), Space at Steppenwolf, the Public, and the Mark Taper Forum (TIME magazine Top Ten),  Stonewall: Night Variations, and 1969 (or Howie Takes a Trip).  With Anne Bogart, Landau has co-authored The Viewpoints Book: A Practical Guide to Viewpoints and Composition.

Landau has taught at Yale University and the Yale School of Drama, Tisch School of the Arts at New York University, University of Chicago, Northwestern University, and Columbia University.

Awards and recognition
Landau was named one of the "Out 100 of 2009" by OUT Magazine.  Landau was named a 2007 USA Ford Fellow and granted $50,000 by United States Artists, an arts advocacy foundation dedicated to the support and promotion of America's top living artists. Landau received a 2018 Tony Award nomination for Best Direction of a Musical for SpongeBob SquarePants at the 72nd Tony Awards. She won awards for Best Direction of a Musical at the 2018 Drama Desk Awards, Drama League Awards, and Outer Critics Circle Awards as well.

Notes
Peterson, Jane T., and Bennett, Suzanne.  Women Playwrights of Diversity: A Bio-Bibliographical Sourcebook, Greenwood Press, 1997. 
Dominus, Susan.  The 9 Habits of Highly Creative Directors, New York Times, September 4, 2005.
Bogart, Anne and Landau, Tina. The Viewpoints Book: A Practical Guide to Viewpoints and Compositions . Theater Communications Group, 2005. 
Hausam, Wiley, ed., The New American Musical: An Anthology from the End of the 20th Century. Theatre Communications Group, 2001.

References

External links

Internet Off-Broadway listing
Tina Landau at Doollee.com
Tina Landau at Steppenwolf.org
Tina Landau at FilmReference.com

1962 births
American acting theorists
American musical theatre librettists
American theatre directors
Women theatre directors
Institute for Advanced Theater Training, Harvard University alumni
LGBT theatre directors
Living people
Postmodern theatre
Tisch School of the Arts faculty
Yale University alumni
Steppenwolf Theatre Company players
Yale School of Drama faculty
LGBT people from New York (state)
American women dramatists and playwrights
20th-century American dramatists and playwrights
20th-century American women writers
21st-century American dramatists and playwrights
21st-century American women writers
Women librettists